The 2009 World Games were held in Kaohsiung, Taiwan, from July 16 to July 26, 2009.

Acrobatic gymnastics

Aerobic gymnastics

Artistic roller skating

Bodybuilding

Boules sports

Bowling

Canoe polo

Cue sports

Dancesport

Field archery

Finswimming

Fistball

Flying disc

Inline hockey

Inline speed skating

Ju-jitsu

Karate

Korfball

Lifesaving

Orienteering

Parachuting

Powerlifting

Racquetball

Rhythmic gymnastics

Rugby sevens

Sport climbing

Squash

Sumo

Trampoline gymnastics

Tug of war

Water skiing

Invitational sports

Beach handball

Dragon boat

Softball

Tchoukball

Wushu

References

External links
 Complete results
 International World Games Association

Medalists
2009